Chittagong, officially Chattogram, also known as the Port City of Bangladesh is a major coastal city and financial centre in southeastern Bangladesh. The city had a population of more than 8.6 million in 2017, making it the second-largest city in the country. It is the capital and administrative seat of an eponymous District and Division. The city is located on the banks of the Karnaphuli River between the Chittagong Hill Tracts and the Bay of Bengal. Modern Chittagong is Bangladesh's second most significant urban center after Dhaka.

The major municipal areas which are a part of the Chittagong Metropolitan Area are:

 Agrabad
 Bhatiari
 Chandgoan residential area
 Faujdarhat
 Halishahar
 Patenga
 North Kattali
 South Kattali
 Pahartali
 Saraipara
 Noapara
 Akbarshah
 Bayazid
 Bakalia
 Panchlaish
 Chawk Bazar
 Mohra
 Khatunganj
 Patharghata
 Bakshirhat
 Sanowara Residential Area
 Hamid Char
 Annona Residential Area
 Burishchar
 Nandan Kanan
 Jamal Khan
 Lalkhan Bazar
 Dampara
 Khulshi Residential Area
 Sholoshahar
 Nasirabad
 Ali Nagar
 Mohammadnagar
 Muradnagar
 Shahidnagar
 Wazedia
 Shershah Colony
 Debar Par
 Arefin Nagar
 Chandranagar
 Burma Colony
 Jhautala
 Rampur
 Sobujbag
 Shamoly Residential Area
 Shantibag Residential Area
 Gosaildanga
 Bansalapara
 Firinghee Bazar
 Ichanagar
 Sadarghat
 Fateabad
 Shahi Colony
 Hathazari

See also
 Neighbourhoods in Dhaka Metropolitan Area

References

Geography of Chittagong
Neighborhoods in Chittagong
Lists of neighbourhoods in Bangladeshi cities
Lists of neighbourhoods